Rafha Domestic Airport is an airport serving Rafha, a town in Northern Borders Province, Saudi Arabia. The airport was established in 1978.

Facilities

Airlines and destinations

Airlines offering scheduled passenger service:

References

External links
 
 
 

Rafha
1978 establishments in Saudi Arabia
Airports in Saudi Arabia